= Rumakali =

River in Tanzania

Coordinates: 9°20′S 33°55′E

The Rumakali River is a river in Tanzania. Draining into the Lake Nyasa, the river has a surface area of 693 square kilometers.

== Planned hydropower ==
A hydroelectric dam of 222MW is planned on the Rumakali River.
